HMS Leopard was a Vickers three funnel - 30 knot destroyer ordered by the Royal Navy under the 1895 – 1896 Naval Estimates.  She was the ninth ship to carry this name since it was introduced in 1635 for a 34-gun ship, captured by the Dutch in 1653.

Construction
Leopard was laid down as Yard Number 254 on 10 June 1896 at the Barrow Shipbuilding Company shipyard at Barrow-in-Furness and launched on 20 March 1897.

Three funnels were fitted. Displacement was  light and  full load, slightly lighter than the three earlier Thirty-knotter destroyers ordered from Barrow as part of the 1895–96 programme (and ).

Armament was specified as a single QF 12 pounder 12 cwt ( calibre) gun on a platform on the ship's conning tower (in practice the platform was also used as the ship's bridge), backed up by five 6-pounder guns, and two 18-inch (450 mm) torpedo tubes. The ship's crew was 63 officers and men.

During her builder's trials she made her contracted speed requirement.  In 1897 during the construction of these ships, the Barrow Shipbuilding Company was purchased by Vickers, Sons and Maxim and renamed as the Naval Construction and Armaments Shipyard.  She was completed and accepted by the Royal Navy in July 1899.

Service

Pre-war
Leopard was commissioned by Lieutenant Alan Everett Hudson on 15 January 1901, to serve as part of the Devonport Destroyer Instructional Flotilla, later that year participating in the 1901 British Naval Manoeuvres. The ship was slightly damaged in a collision with floating debris in January 1902, and was replaced in the Devonport Flotilla in March 1902. She underwent repairs to re-tube her boilers later that year, when she was refitted by Vickers, Sons and Maxim.

On 7 August 1906 Leopard collided with a buoy in the Hamoaze, but not before she hit the destroyer  in trying to avoid the buoy. Leopard was holed below the waterline, requiring the ship to be docked for repair, while Kennets rudder was damaged. Leopard had her boilers retubed again at Portsmouth Dockyard in July 1908, missing that year's Naval Manoeuvres. In 1910 Leopard formed part of the 5th Destroyer Flotilla, tendered to the depot ship  at Devonport, and was still part of that Flotilla in 1912. A reorganisation of the Royal Navy's destroyer force took place in 1912, with older destroyers, no longer suitable for fleet use, being used to equip Patrol Flotillas, with Leopard forming part of the 7th Flotilla at Devonport.

On 30 August 1912 the Admiralty directed all destroyers were to be grouped into classes designated by letters based on contract speed and appearance. As a three-funneled destroyer with a contract speed of 30 knots, Leopard was assigned to the C Class. The class letters were painted on the hull below the bridge area and on a funnel.

First World War
For the test mobilization in July 1914 she was assigned to the 7th Destroyer Flotilla based at Devonport tendered to Leander.  At the outbreak of war, the 7th was redeployed to the Humber River.  Her duties within the Humber Patrol were to prevent enemy ships from carrying out minelaying or torpedo attacks in the approaches to ports on the East coast, and to prevent raids by enemy ships.

On 3 November 1914, Leopard was taking part in a routine patrol off the Norfolk coast near the port of Yarmouth, as was the destroyer  and the torpedo gunboat  when Halcyon encountered a force of German battlecruisers and cruisers making a raid on Yarmouth. While all three British ships were heavily engaged by the German force, only Halcyon was hit before the Germans fired a few shells towards Yarmouth and retired. Leopard was undamaged.

Later in November 1914, Leopard was transferred to the Scapa Flow local defence flotilla. Leopard remained at Scapa Flow until January 1918, moving to the Firth of Forth in February 1918. Leopard returned to the 7th Flotilla, still based on the Humber, in May 1918, remaining there until the end of the war.

In 1919 she was paid off and laid-up in reserve awaiting disposal.  She was sold on 10 June 1919 to J. Jackson for breaking.

Pennant Numbers

Notes

Citations

Bibliography
 
 
 
 
 
 
 
 
 
 
 
 
 
 
 
 

 

Ships built in Barrow-in-Furness
1897 ships
C-class destroyers (1913)
World War I destroyers of the United Kingdom